The Moudge or Mowj is a class of domestically-produced Iranian light frigates.

History 
A Moudge-class ship was first reported to be under construction in 2001. Warship International wrote in 2008 that four ships of this class were under construction: Mowj (376) launched on 22 February 2007, Jamaran (377) launched on 28 November 2007, as well as Azarakhsh (378) and Tondar (379). 

The first ship, Jamaran is said to be completed and is stationed in the port of Bandar Abbas. Damavand is the second ship in this class. According to OSGEOINT, Damavand was constructed at the Shahid Tamjidi Marine Industries (STMI) fabrication shop on the Caspian Sea at Bandar-e Anzali. The frigate was launched in March 2013.

Damavand, based out of Bandar-Anzali on the Caspian Sea, ran aground on a concrete breakwater in the vicinity of its home port on 10 January 2018. It is believed probable that the incident was the result of navigational error, affected by a strong storm in the area which creating high wave heights and low visibility in the area. During the incident six members of the ship's crew fell overboard. Four of those crew members were later rescued, two were considered missing by media sources. The Iranian Navy declined to confirm the reporting. There has been little information released in reference to the cause of the grounding, with exception to statements of wave height and visibility caused by the storm at the time of the grounding.

Damavand is currently listed as actively commissioned. Photos from 2018 show that the ship's hull has broken apart from near the waterline approximately at the near the start of the ships aircraft deck.

Iranian Navy commissioned "Dena" with a ceremony held in Bandar Abbas on 14 June 2021. 

Future units of the Modge class are set to be equipped with the Sayyad-2 anti-aircraft missiles.

During construction, frigate Talaiyeh suddenly capsized while in dry dock. Killing one Navy personnel, no official reports have been release by the Iranian authorities.

Classification
Sources differ in specifying the type of the class, either as light frigate or corvette.

Jane's Fighting Ships classifies the class as FFG of frigate while the Military Balance of the International Institute of Strategic Studies (IISS), designates the ships in the class as FSGM or corvette.

Ships in the class

See also

 List of frigates of Iran
 List of frigate classes
 List of naval ship classes of Iran
 List of naval ship classes in service

References

External links

Frigate classes
 
Ship classes of the Islamic Republic of Iran Navy